Sonny's Story is an album by blues musician Sonny Terry recorded in 1960 and released on the Bluesville label.

Reception

AllMusic reviewer Thom Owens stated: "Sonny's Story is an excellent showcase for Sonny Terry's talents, which sometimes went unheralded because they largely were showcased in the shadow of Brownie McGhee ... Sonny's Story is positively infectious. It's hard not to get caught up in Terry's shouts and boogies, and that's one major reason why this is among his best solo recordings".

Track listing
All compositions by Sonny Terry
 "I Ain't Gonna Be Your Dog No More" – 3:44
 "My Baby Done Gone" – 3:24
 "Worried Blues" – 3:55
 "High Powered Woman" – 2:59
 "Pepperheaded Woman" – 4:06
 "Sonny's Story" – 3:26
 "I'm Gonna Get on My Feets Afterwhile" – 4:04
 "Four O'Clock Blues" – 3:34
 "Telephone Blues" – 3:35
 "Great Tall Engine" – 2:56

Personnel

Performance
Sonny Terry – harmonica, vocals
J. C. Burris – harmonica
Sticks McGhee – guitar
Belton Evans – drums

Production
 Rudy Van Gelder – engineer

References

Sonny Terry albums
1960 albums
Bluesville Records albums
Albums recorded at Van Gelder Studio